Rachel Cliff (1806–1885) was one of two women to serve as an official delegate to the Philadelphia meeting of the 1855 Colored Convention, along with Elizabeth Armstrong. She worked as a "janitrix", or janitress, in Philadelphia.

Early life
Rachel Cliff was born in New Jersey, the home-state of both of her parents, in 1806.  She moved to Philadelphia, Pennsylvania and married Isaac Cliff, a barber.

Activism
Cliff was involved with the Colored Conventions Movement, a movement composed of free and fugitive African Americans that sought to advance African American rights in law, labor, and education.

1855 Colored National Convention
Cliff was a delegate at the 1855 National Colored Convention in Philadelphia, one in a series of conventions comprising the Colored Conventions Movement. She was one of only two female delegates from Pennsylvania.  During the 1855 convention, delegates discussed the creation of an Industrial School for African Americans, heard a report from the Committee on Mechanical Branches among the Colored People of the Free States, and issued an address on behalf of those held in slavery.

Personal life 

Rachel Cliff had a son, John Cliff, in 1839 or 1840. Rachel Cliff was married to Isaac Cliff, who predeceased her. Rachel was widowed some time before 1874, when she is listed in the Philadelphia City Directory as a "janitrix," a female janitor. She was later listed as keeping house with two of her nephews, a musician and a waiter, in 1880.

Death
Rachel Cliff died in Philadelphia, Pennsylvania on June 28, 1885 at the 24th Ward Home for Aged and Infirm Colored Persons and was interred on June 30 in Lebanon Cemetery.

References 

African-American people
Colored Conventions people
1806 births
1885 deaths